Bendigo and Adelaide Bank is an Australian financial institution, operating primarily in retail banking. The company was formed by the merger of Bendigo Bank and Adelaide Bank in November 2007.

Before the merger, Bendigo Bank delivered its products and services through almost 900 outlets Australia-wide, including more than 160 company owned branches, 220 community owned Community Bank branches of Bendigo Bank, 100 agencies and 400 Elders outlets. The bank's branches are primarily in Victoria and Queensland.  The merged bank now has over 400 branches, including 25 that came with the merger of Adelaide Bank.

National headquarters remain in the city of Bendigo, with a major office in Adelaide, South Australia and regional offices in Docklands, Melbourne and Ipswich, Queensland.

History and development 
The company started in 1858 as a fixed-term (terminating) building society to improve conditions in the Bendigo goldfields during the Victorian gold rush.

At seven years old, in 1865, the company restructured, taking the name Bendigo Mutual Permanent Land and Building Society, which incorporated in Victoria 11 years afterwards. It continued to expand its holdings when, in 1978, it merged with Bendigo and Eaglehawk Star, a building society established in 1901.

Further growth involved the acquisition of the building societies Sandhurst, in 1983, and Sunraysia, in 1985, a merger with Sandhurst Trustees Ltd and the acquisition of Capital and Compass building societies..

In 1982 BBS became the first financial institution in Australia to introduce successfully both Visa credit and debit cards.

1993 saw BBS receive a stockmarket listing. Its growth continued throughout the 90s when it acquired National Mortgage Market Corporation Limited in 1995, a mortgage-manager company focussed on loan introducers and brokers. In that year BBS converted to a bank with the name Bendigo Bank. In 1997, Bendigo Bank acquired Monte Paschi Australia from Banca Monte dei Paschi di Siena, an Italian banking group, for AU$42.255M. Monte Paschi Australia was renamed Cassa Commerciale Australia in the same year.

Bendigo Bank's "Community Bank" program began in 1998—the first branches opened in the western Victoria towns of Minyip and Rupanyup on 26 June and the first metropolitan branch in the outer eastern suburb of Upwey on 19 October.

The late 1990s saw a further development when Bendigo Bank and Elders Australia formed Elders Rural Bank, a joint venture company focused on agribusiness and rural Australia. Bendigo Bank was also the first financial institution to introduce a mortgage offset account, now a standard banking product in Australia.

In 1999 the bank formed an alliance involving mutual shareholding with IOOF.

The bank received its operating licence in 2000 and absorbed the First Australian Building Society in Queensland, acquiring a new regional headquarters in Ipswich. That same year saw a A$75 million head office expansion in Bendigo.

In 2002 Bendigo Bank introduced the first "Green Loans" in Australia and formed "Community Sector Banking", a banking joint venture with the not-for-profit sector.

Three years later, Bendigo Bank built a regional headquarters on Harbour Esplanade in Melbourne, Docklands.

In 2007 Bendigo Bank rejected Bank of Queensland's merger/takeover proposal, and merged with Adelaide Bank. The A$4 billion takeover was completed on 30 November. Subsequently, shareholders voted to change the company's name to Bendigo and Adelaide Bank Limited, with the change taking effect from 31 March 2008.

On 11 December 2008, Bendigo Bank's new headquarters in Bendigo was completed. The 26th Prime Minister of Australia, Kevin Rudd, was present at the opening.

On 16 December 2011, Bendigo Bank announced that it had reached agreement with the Bank of Cyprus Group to acquire its 100 per cent owned Australian subsidiary, Bank of Cyprus Australia Limited (BOCAL). The purchase was for an estimated total consideration of A$130 million. It was renamed Delphi Bank.

In April 2013, Bendigo Bank's subsidiary 'Oxford Funding' was rebranded as Bendigo Debtor Finance, offering independent credit assessments and cash-flow solutions to businesses on a national level.

In June 2014, the bank became the first in Australia to adopt an investment policy which shunned fossil fuel investments. "Specifically, the bank does not lend to companies for whom the core activity is the exploration, mining, manufacture or export of thermal coal or coal seam gas."

On 1 March 2015, a group of credit unions diverged from Cuscal and aligned with Bendigo and Adelaide Bank to form Alliance Bank. The credit unions were AWA Credit Union/Mutual (Geelong, 1969), Circle Credit Co-operative Limited (Deer Park, 1969), Service One Credit Union (ACT, circa 1950), BDCU (Berrima, 1963), and in 2018 NOVA (Newcastle, 1964). Alliance Bank maintains some autonomy, but conducts regulated banking activities through Bendigo and Adelaide Bank.  They still market themselves under their original name suffixed with "Alliance Bank" and declare themselves agents of Bendigo and Adelaide Bank.

Community Bank program 

Community banking is based on a 'profit-with-purpose' model, which means that profits are returned directly to the community that has generated them, after paying branch running costs. The program was a response to the massive closure of bank branches, predominantly in rural areas. Bendigo Bank has since extended the program to major metropolitan areas with existing bank services. Since 1998, Bendigo Community Banks have reinvested more than $272 million back into local communities.

Subsidiaries of Bendigo and Adelaide Bank include Community Bank, Rural Bank, Up, Bendigo Debtor Finance (formerly Oxford Funding), Leveraged Equities, Sandhurst Trustees, Delphi Bank (formerly Bank of Cyprus Australia), and Community Enterprise Foundation. ,

Bendigo and Adelaide Bank had acquired Wheeler Financial Services which was merged with Bendigo Financial Planning, and also acquired Southern Finance.

See also 

 Banking in Australia
 List of banks
 List of banks in Australia
 List of banks in Oceania
 Fincorp, a failed investment company trusteed for by Sandhurst Trustees

References

External links 
 Bendigo and Adelaide Bank – Official site

Banks of Australia
Companies listed on the Australian Securities Exchange
1858 establishments in Australia
Banks established in 1858
Bendigo
Mutual savings banks in Australia